Mariano Gómez (born 5 February 1999) is an Argentine professional footballer who plays as a centre-back for Spanish club CD Badajoz, on loan from Atlético Madrid.

Club career
Gómez started his career with Unión Santa Fe. He was first an unused substitute for an Argentine Primera División match with Lanús on 13 October 2017, prior to making his professional debut under manager Leonardo Madelón on 25 November against Patronato. Gómez made one further appearance, versus Arsenal de Sarandí, during the 2017–18 season as Unión qualified for the 2019 Copa Sudamericana. In January 2019, Gómez moved to Spanish football on loan with Ibiza of Segunda División B. His bow came on 14 April in a win over Cartagena. In total, he appeared twenty-three times and scored once; versus Peña Deportiva.

On 5 September 2020, Gómez was purchased by fellow Segunda División B team Atlético Madrid B; he signed a five-year contract. His first appearance arrived on 18 October in a win over newly-promoted Poblense. Six games later, on 29 January 2021, he headed to fellow Segunda División B side Racing de Ferrol on loan until the end of 2020–21.

On 24 August 2021, Gómez was loaned to Primera División RFEF side Algeciras CF, on loan for one year.

International career
In February 2018, Gómez was selected to train with the Argentina U19s. He also had experience with the U20s.

Career statistics
.

References

External links

1999 births
Living people
People from Esperanza, Santa Fe
Argentine footballers
Association football defenders
Argentine expatriate footballers
Expatriate footballers in Spain
Argentine expatriate sportspeople in Spain
Argentine Primera División players
Primera Federación players
Segunda División B players
Unión de Santa Fe footballers
UD Ibiza players
Atlético Madrid B players
Racing de Ferrol footballers
Algeciras CF footballers
Sportspeople from Santa Fe Province